The True History of Puss 'N Boots is a 2009 French-Belgian-Swiss-American animated film directed by Jérôme Deschamps, Pascal Herold and Macha Makeïeff. It is based on Charles Perrault's story "Puss in Boots" about a cat who talks and walks on his hind legs while wearing magical boots.

Technology
The True History of Puss 'N Boots was animated in RenderBox. The in-house rendering engine By Nadeo based on Their own engine Gamebox which powers the TrackMania series and some Virtual Skipper games.

Voice cast
Jérôme Deschamps as Le Chat Botté (Puss 'N Boots) / La Meunier (The Miller) / La Paysan (The Peasant)
Arthur Deschamps as P'tit Pierre (Peter)
Louise Wallon as La Princesse (The Princess)
Yolande Moreau as La Reine (The Queen)
Atmen Kelif as Marcel / Le Cuisinier (The Cook)
Jean-Claude Bolle-Reddat as Le Chambellan (The Chamberlain)
François Toumarkine as Le Bossu (The Hunchback)
Pascal Ternisien as Gaston
Hervé Lassïnce as Maurice / Gardes Ogre (Guard Ogre) / Le Bûcheron (The Woodcutter) / Serveurs (Waiter)
Philippe Leygnac as Le Fou (The Jester)
Pascal Hérold as Charles Perrault
André Wilms as L'Ogre (The Ogre)
Robert Horn as L'Intendant
Macha Makeïeff as La Serveuse (The Waitress) / La Toucan

English-language version
Richard Dumont (Canada/UK), William Shatner (US) as Puss 'N Boots
Daniel Brochu as Peter
Holly Gauthier-Frankel as The Princess
Pauline Little as The Queen
Mark Camacho as Doc Marcel
Arthur Holden as The Chamberlain
Michael Perron as The Hunchback
Terrence Scammel as Gaston
Thor Bishopric as Maurice
Hubert Feilden as The Miller
Rick Jones as The Jester
Bruce Dinsmore as The Butler
Marcel Jeannin as Charles Perrault
Alain Goulem as The Ogre

See also
 Adaptations of Puss in Boots

References
 
 

2009 films
Films based on Puss in Boots
2009 animated films
French animated films
Belgian animated films
Swiss animated films
Animated films about cats
2000s French films